Pir Alqar (also Romanized as Pīr Ālqar and Pīrāl Qīr) is a village in Balghelu Rural District, in the Central District of Ardabil County, Ardabil Province, Iran. At the 2006 census, its population was 432, in 96 families.

References 

Towns and villages in Ardabil County